is Japanese singer Ringo Sheena's 6th single and it was released on January 26, 2000, by Toshiba EMI / Virgin Music. It was certified double platinum by the RIAJ for 545,730 copies shipped to stores.

Background 
"Tsumi to Batsu" is taken from Sheena's second album Shōso Strip. When she sang this song on her first national tour Senkō Ecstasy, she joked with her fans, "If you want to buy this song as a single, please send a letter to Toshiba-EMI".
Then, the letters actually poured in to Toshiba EMI, and it was decided to release this song. Ken-ichi Asai, ex-Blankey Jet City, plays the guitar on "Tsumi to Batsu."

The song was covered by Takashi Obara on his piano cover album Try Try Try "Piano yo Utae" Special (2004) and by General Head Mountain on their third album Tsuki Kanashi Blue (2006). It was covered again by Blistar on Blistar Rockin' Covers: Rock & Sexy (2011).

Track listing

Cover versions 
In 2008, Japanese three-piece band General Head Mountain covered it on their album Tsukikanashi Blue. In 2018 Japanese-American singer Ai covered "Tsumi to Batsu". The song, titled as "Crime and Punishment", was included on the album Fruit Défendu, a tribute album featuring a variety of Sheena Ringo's songs covered by multiple artists.

Credits and personnel 
Tsumi to Batsu
 Vocals: Shiina Ringo 
 Electric guitars and Tooth Flute: Ken-ichi Asai "Benzie" (from Blankey Jet City)
 Bass guitars: Seiji Kameda
 Drums: Masayuki Muraishi
 Organ: Yuta Saito

Kimi no Hitomi ni Koishiteru
 
 Vocals: Shiina Ringo 
 Electric guitars: Susumu Nishikawa
 Electric Bass, Handclap: Seiji Kameda
 Drums: Masayuki Muraishi
 Synthesizer: Makoto Minagawa

17
 Vocals: Shiina Ringo 
 Electric guitars: Susumu Nishikawa
 Bass guitars: Seiji Kameda 
 Drums and Tambourines: Noriyasu "Kāsuke" Kawamura 
 Piano: Yuta Saito
 Synthesizer programming: Nobuhiko Nakayama
 The Strings: Chieko Kinbara Group

References 

2000 singles
2000 songs
Ringo Sheena songs
Song recordings produced by Seiji Kameda
Songs written by Ringo Sheena
Ai (singer) songs